The 19th Annual Japan Record Awards took place at the Imperial Garden Theater in Chiyoda, Tokyo, on December 31, 1977, starting at 7:00PM JST. The primary ceremonies were televised in Japan on TBS.

Winners

Japan Record Award
Kenji Sawada – "Katte ni Shiyagare"
Lyrics: Yū Aku
Music: Katsuo Ōno
Arrangement: Motoki Funayama
Record Company: Polydor Records

Best Vocalist
Aki Yashiro

Best New Artist
Kentaro Shimizu

Singing Award
Momoe Yamaguchi – "Cosmos"
Hiromi Iwasaki – "Shisūki"
Sayuri Ishikawa – "Tsugaru Kaikyō Fuyugeshiki"

Popular Award
Pink Lady – "Wanted (Shimei Tehai)"

Newcomer Award
Karyūdo – Azusa No. 2
Ikue Sakakibara – Al Pacino + Alain Delon < You
Mizue Takada – Glass-zaka
Yosuke Tagawa – Lui-Lui

Shinpei Nakayama Award (Composition Award)
Hiromi Iwasaki – "Shisūki" / Sayuri Ishikawa – "Tsugaru Kaikyō Fuyugeshiki"
Composer: Takashi Miki

Arrangement Award
Kenji Sawada – "Katte ni Shiyagare" / Akira Fuse – "Ryoshū ~Igaruganite~"
Arrangement: Motoki Funayama

Yaso Saijō Award (Lyricist Award)
Masashi Sada – "Ame Yadori" / Momoe Yamaguchi – "Cosmos"
Lyrics: Masashi Sada

Special Award
Minoru Obata
Akira Kobayashi
Frank Nagai
Hachiro Kasuga

Nominations

Best 10 JRA Nominations

Best New Artist

External links
Official Website

Japan Record Awards
Japan Record Awards
Japan Record Awards
Japan Record Awards
1977